Hand on the Torch is the debut studio album by British jazz rap group Us3. It received much attention because of its mixture of jazz with hip-hop music, with material from popular jazz musicians of the 20th century being reimagined. All samples used on the album are from old Blue Note Records classics: the most famous was Herbie Hancock's "Cantaloupe Island", which Us3 used on the track "Cantaloop (Flip Fantasia)". It came out as a single having two different music videos.

In 2003, The Ultimate Hand on the Torch was released, including many of the songs used as sampling material on Hand on the Torch.

Being released in the midst of social and commercial controversy over the nature of sampling in music during the early 1990s, the album became a critical success and also reached a widespread audience, with the work being nominated for a Grammy Award. It also was the first platinum-certified album put out by Blue Note Records. In 2016, the musical publication MusicRadar labeled the release a "hip-hop tour de force".

Track listing
"Cantaloop (Flip Fantasia)" (Kelly, Simpson, Wilkinson, Herbie Hancock) - 4:39
"I Got It Goin' On" (Powell, Kelly, Simpson, Wilkinson, Reuben Wilson) - 5:18
"Different Rhythms Different People" (Simpson, Wilkinson) - 1:16
"It's Like That" (Powell, Simpson, Wilkinson, Parker, Sonny Rollins) - 3:41
"Just Another Brother" (Powell, Simpson, Wilkinson, Freddie Hubbard) - 3:42
"Cruisin'" (Kelly, Simpson, Wilkinson) - 3:30
"I Go to Work" (Powell, Simpson, Wilkinson, Thelonious Monk) - 4:06
"Tukka Yoot's Riddim" (Taylor, Simpson, Wilkinson, Don Covay, Steve Cropper) - 5:41
"Knowledge of Self" (Kelly, Simpson, Wilkinson) - 4:18
"Lazy Day" (Powell, Simpson, Wilkinson, Joe Sample) - 4:40
"Eleven Long Years" (Taylor, Simpson, Wilkinson, Horace Silver, Hancock) - 3:47
"Make Tracks" (Powell, Simpson, Wilkinson, Silver, Duke Pearson) - 4:45
"The Darkside" (Kelly, Simpson, Wilkinson, Larry Mizell) - 5:19

Sampling
 "Cantaloop (Flip Fantasia)" features samples from "Cantaloupe Island" as performed by Herbie Hancock, and the introduction by Pee Wee Marquette from "A Night in Birdland, Vol. 1" by Art Blakey Quintet.
 "I Got It Goin' On" features a sample from "Ronnie's Bonnie" as performed by Reuben Wilson.
 "Different Rhythms Different People"  features vocal samples from "Art Blakey's Comment On Ritual" and "At The Cafe Bohemia, Vol. 2" by The Jazz Messengers.
 "It's Like That" features samples from "Alfie's Theme" as performed by Big John Patton and "Cool Blues" as performed by Lou Donaldson.
 "Just Another Brother" features samples from "Crisis" as performed by Art Blakey and the Jazz Messengers.
 "I Go To Work" features samples from "Straight No Chaser" as performed by Thelonious Monk.
 "Tukka Yoot's Riddim" features samples from "Sookie Sookie" as performed by Grant Green.
 "Lazy Day" features a sample from "Goin' Down South" as performed by Bobby Hutcherson.
 "Eleven Long Years" features samples from "Song For My Father" as performed by Horace Silver and "Blind Man, Blind Man" as performed by Herbie Hancock.
 "Make Tracks" features samples from "Filthy McNasty" as performed by Horace Silver and "Jeannine" as performed by Donald Byrd.
 "The Darkside" features a sample from "Steppin' Into Tomorrow" as performed by Donald Byrd.

Personnel
 Rap – Rahsaan Kelly and Kobie Powell (guest Tukka Yoot on Tukka Yoot's Riddim)
 Trumpet – Gerard Presencer
 Trombone – Dennis Rollins
 Tenor Sax – Mike Smith
 Soprano and Tenor Sax – Ed Jones
 Guitar – Tony Remy
 Piano – Matt Cooper

Charts

Weekly charts

Year-end charts

Certifications

Notes

1993 debut albums
Us3 albums
Blue Note Records albums